The fourth election to the Carmarthenshire County Council was held on 1 May 2008. It was preceded by the 2004 election and followed by the 2012 election. While the Independent councillors again had the largest number of seats, Plaid Cymru gained considerable ground, notably in the Llanelli and Ammanford areas. The Independents formed a coalition with Labour.

Full results of the election were published in the local press.

Overview

|}

Results

Abergwili (one seat)

Ammanford (one seat)

Betws (one seat)

Bigyn two seats)

Burry Port (two seats)

Bynea (one seat)

Carmarthen Town North (two seats)

Carmarthen Town South (two seats)

Carmarthen Town West (two seats)

Cenarth (one seat)

Cilycwm (one seat)

Cynwyl Elfed (one seat)

Cynwyl Gaeo (one seat)

Dafen (one seat)

Elli (one seat)
John Paul Jenkins was elected as a Conservative in 2004 but subsequently became an Independent

Felinfoel (one seat)

Garnant (one seat)

Glanaman (one seat)

Glanymor (two seats)

Glyn (one seat)

Gorslas (two seats)

Hendy (one seat)

Hengoed (two seats)

Kidwelly (one seat)

Laugharne Township (one seat)

Llanboidy (one seat)

Llanddarog (one seat)

Llandeilo (one seat)

Llandovery Town (one seat)

Llandybie  (two seats)
Anthony Davies was elected at a by-election following the death of the previous Independent councillor, Mary Thomas.

Llanegwad (one seat)

Llanfihangel Aberbythych (one seat)

Llanfihangel-ar-Arth (one seat)

Llangadog  (one seat)

Llangeler (one seat)

Llangennech (two seats)

Llangunnor (one seat)

Llangyndeyrn (one seat)

Llannon (two seats)

Llansteffan (one seat)

Llanybydder (one seat)

Lliedi (two seats)

Llwynhendy (two seats)
Two Independent former Labour councillors defended their seats but one of those seats was lost to Plaid Cymru whose candidate, Meilyr Hughes had served as a councillor previously.

Manordeilo and Salem  (one seat)

Pembrey (two seats)

Penygroes (one seat)

Pontamman (one seat)

Pontyberem (one seat)

Quarter Bach  (one seat)

St Clears (one seat)

St Ishmaels (one seat)

Saron (two seats)

Swiss Valley (one seat)

Trelech (one seat)

Trimsaran (one seat)

Tycroes (one seat)

Tyisha (two seats)

Whitland (one seat)

By-Elections 2008-2012

Llanegwad by-election 2011
A by-election was held in Llanegwad on 23 June 2011 following the retirement of long-serving Independent councillor Dillwyn Williams.

References

2008
2008 Welsh local elections
21st century in Carmarthenshire